Liana Hayrapetyan (born 14 July 1975) is a professional football player and manager in Armenia and coach who currently manages a Football team in Football Federation of Armenia on position of head coach of Armenian  women's team U-19.

Playing career
Championship Participation as a Football player

1987 – USSR Unofficial Football Championship

1990 – “Leather Ball”. Dnepropetrovsk

1991 – “Leather Ball”. Zaporozhye, Minsk

1992 – RA Friendly Tournament

1992 – RA First Championship. “Kilikia” Team. First Place

1992 – International Championship. Austria

1999 – RA Second Championship. First Place

2000 – Tournament futsal (Moscow)

2001 – Tournament futsal (Poltava)

2001 – Champions league (Germany) College Club

2003 – World Cup Preliminarily round (National Team)

See also
List of Armenia women's international footballers

External links

1975 births
Living people
Armenian women's footballers
Armenia women's international footballers
Women's association football central defenders
Armenian football managers
Female association football managers